Blankensee refers to the following places in Germany:

 Blankensee, Mecklenburg
 Blankensee, Uecker-Randow